This is a table of Clebsch–Gordan coefficients used for adding angular momentum values in quantum mechanics. Tables with the same sign convention may be found in the Particle Data Group's Review of Particle Properties and in online tables.

Formulation
The Clebsch–Gordan coefficients are the solutions to

Explicitly:

The summation is extended over all integer  for which the argument of every factorial is nonnegative.

They may be calculated using the simple relations

 

and

Specific values 

The Clebsch–Gordan coefficients for j values less than or equal to 5/2 are given below.































SU(N) Clebsch–Gordan coefficients

A web interface for tabulating SU(N) Clebsch–Gordan coefficients is readily available.

References

External links
 Online, Java-based Clebsch–Gordan Coefficient Calculator by Paul Stevenson
 Other formulae for Clebsch–Gordan coefficients.
  Web interface for tabulating SU(N) Clebsch–Gordan coefficients

Representation theory of Lie groups
Clebsch–Gordan coefficients